Danilo Wiebe (born 22 March 1994) is a German professional footballer who plays as a midfielder for German club Eintracht Braunschweig.

Playing career
Born in Siegburg, Wiebe played for local clubs SSV Kaldauen and Bonner SC as a youth. In 2009, he joined the youth system of 1. FC Köln. He helped them win the DFB Junioren Pokal (German Youth Cup) during the 2012–13 season. Wiebe then got promoted to the Köln reserve team in June 2013.

Wiebe went on to make 48 Regionalliga West appearances for the Köln reserves during the 2013–14 and 2014–15 seasons.

In June 2015, Wiebe signed a one-year contract with 3. Liga side Preußen Münster. He made his professional debut on 31 July during a 3–1 win over Stuttgart II, where he replaced Amaury Bischoff after 80 minutes. He scored his first professional goal on 5 September in a 3–1 win over Werder Bremen II. Firing from outside the penalty box, he tucked the ball into the top right corner of the goal with a right-footed strike. His goal came only six minutes after he was substituted into the game.

References

External links
 
 
 Danilo Wiebe profile at SoccerPunter

1994 births
Living people
People from Siegburg
Sportspeople from Cologne (region)
German footballers
Association football midfielders
1. FC Köln II players
SC Preußen Münster players
Eintracht Braunschweig players
Footballers from North Rhine-Westphalia
3. Liga players